Binge is a video streaming subscription service available in Australia, owned by Streamotion (a wholly owned subsidiary of Foxtel). The service offers on demand and live entertainment, lifestyle, reality and movie programming.

History
In August 2018 it was reported Foxtel were expected to announce an entertainment subscription video on demand (SVOD) service. The service, internally codenamed Project Jupiter, aimed to combat the building competition from streaming services such as Netflix, Stan, and Amazon Prime Video. This new service would complement Foxtel's sports SVOD service which had been given the go-ahead (later launched as Kayo Sports) as well as offer an alternative to traditional satellite and cable Foxtel services. 

In October 2018, it was reported that Project Jupiter would launch in the first half of 2019 to coincide with the final season of Game of Thrones. In March 2019 it was reported Foxtel had green-lit Project Jupiter, however, it would not launch in early 2019 as previously reported. In September 2019 it was reported Foxtel had assembled a staff of 40 ahead of the launch who were located within the same facility as sister-company Kayo Sports. It was also noted the service's code name had changed from Project Jupiter to Project Ares.

On 23 May 2020 it was announced the new service would be called Binge. It officially launched on 25 May 2020.

Subscribers

Content
At launch Binge was reported to offer over 10,000 hours of entertainment, lifestyle, reality and movie content without advertisements, which was expected to expand to 20,000 hours of content within 12 months.

Output deals 
Binge's content is drawn primarily from output deals with Foxtel. Not all content available on Foxtel may be available on Binge due to competing agreements with other distributors (including other Australian TV channels) and/or streaming services in Australia. 

Ahead of Binge's launch, Foxtel and Binge acquired Australian rights to HBO Max original programmes distributed by Warner Bros. Television Studios. In September 2022, Foxtel announced that WWE Network content would move exclusively to Binge in January 2023.

Some of Binge’s suppliers include:

 20th Television (via Walt Disney Studios; selected titles)
 ABC Commercial
 All3Media
 Amblin Partners (via NBCUniversal)
 Banijay
 BBC Studios
 Cineflix Rights
 CNN (via Warner Bros. Discovery)
 Columbia Pictures (via Sony Pictures)
 DC Entertainment (via Warner Bros. Discovery)
 Focus Features (via NBCUniversal) 
 Fremantle
 HBO (via Warner Bros. Discovery)
 HBO Max (via Warner Bros. Discovery)
 ITV Studios
 Lionsgate
 Madman Entertainment
 Metro-Goldwyn-Mayer
 Miramax (via Paramount Global)
 NBCUniversal
 New Line Cinema (via Warner Bros. Discovery)
 Paramount Pictures (via Paramount Global)
 Seven Studios
 StudioCanal
 Sony Pictures Television
 Summit Entertainment (via Lionsgate)
 Telepictures (via Warner Bros. Discovery)
 TriStar Pictures (via Sony Pictures)
 United Artists
 Universal Pictures (via NBCUniversal)
 Paramount Global
 Village Roadshow Pictures
 Warner Bros. Pictures (via Warner Bros. Discovery)
 Warner Bros. Discovery

Movies 
Binge has access to some of Foxtel movie output deals for movies including Australian cinema, Hollywood blockbusters, British films, independent film and other global releases. Binge may or may not share a same day release with Foxtel's Foxtel Movies release depending on the title and the output deal with its distributor. Some blockbusters like  Universal Pictures’ Fast & Furious franchise had an exclusive window on Foxtel's Movies Package before being made available to Binge and other Foxtel on demand subscribes.

Live linear TV channels 
Binge also carries a lineup of 25 live linear television networks from Foxtel and other broadcasters;

Foxtel Owned: 
 Fox One
 Fox Showcase
 Fox Crime
 Fox Docos
 Fox Sleuth
 Lifestyle
 Lifestyle Food
 Lifestyle Home
 Fox Arena
 A&E 
 Crime + Investigation
 History

 
BBC UKTV
 BBC First
 BBC Earth
 BBC Kids
 CBeebies
 Universal TV
 E!
 DreamWorks Channel
 MTV
 Nickelodeon
 Nick Jr.
 Cartoon Network
 Boomerang

Subscription packages 

As of May 25, 2020, Binge offers three tiers of monthly subscriptions defined by the number of simultaneous streams allowed – 1, 2, or 4 – and the quality of the streamed content from Standard Definition to High Definition. The subscriptions range from $10 to $18.

Supported devices 

Hardware supported

The devices on this list are supported by Binge:

 Apple TV - supported on 4th Generation or higher on tvOS 12+
 Apple iPhones and iPads - supported on iOS 12+
 Android Mobiles and Tablets - supported on Android 7+
 Android TV OS - supported on Version 7.0+
 Samsung Smart TV - Supported on all Samsung Smart TV's from 2017 onwards
 Telstra TV - supported on TTV1 (4200TL), TTV2 (4700TL) and TTV3 (4701TL)
 Chromecast - supported on Chromecast Ultra and latest 3rd Generation +

Software supported

Supported web browsers by platform:

 macOS (10.12+): Safari, Google Chrome or Firefox
 Windows (10+): Google Chrome, Microsoft Edge or Firefox

See also 
 Foxtel Now
 Kayo Sports
 Internet television in Australia
 Subscription television in Australia
 List of streaming media services

References

External links

2020 establishments in Australia
Australian entertainment websites
Internet properties established in 2020
Subscription video on demand services
Foxtel
Australian streaming companies